Duty Now for the Future is the second studio album by American rock band Devo, released in July 1979 by Warner Bros. Records. Produced by Ken Scott, the album was recorded between September 1978 and early 1979 at Chateau Recorders in Hollywood. The majority of the songs on the album had been performed in Devo's live set as early as 1976.

Background
A majority of the album's tracks had already been written and performed live before the release of the band's first album, Q: Are We Not Men? A: We Are Devo!. The earliest song, "Smart Patrol", was debuted live in April 1975. At the time, Devo were a quartet consisting of bassist Gerald Casale, keyboardist Mark Mothersbaugh, guitarist Bob Mothersbaugh, and percussionist Jim Mothersbaugh. The quartet line-up is featured in The Truth About De-Evolution, a short film by the group which features an early recording of "Secret Agent Man."

In December 1976, the group formed the quintet line-up found on this album, replacing Jim Mothersbaugh with Alan Myers and introducing multi-instrumentalist Bob Casale. By this point, the group were performing "Clockout", "Timing X" and "Blockhead" live. "Clockout" and "Timing X" had been written by Gerald Casale and Mark Mothersbaugh respectively, while Bob and Mark co-wrote "Blockhead". "Clockout", in particular, took advantage of this expanded line-up and featured Bob Casale playing bass, in a role that Gerald usually would take.

From this period until March 1977, the group performed regularly at a local venue named the Crypt and filmed part of a short documentary on the band there, which featured "Devo Corporate Anthem" during the film's title card. Also in the documentary is a short excerpt from "Mr. DNA".

By December 1977, the group had relocated from Akron, Ohio to California, where they had already begun recording their first album. That month, they performed at Max's Kansas City in New York and debuted the Mothersbaugh brothers' compositions "Wiggly World" and "Pink Pussycat."

The song "Red Eye" was first played live as the encore to the Q: Are We Not Men tour in October 1978. It features Devo mascot Booji Boy (Mark Mothersbaugh) on lead vocals. From 1976 and 1977, the group primarily wrote songs for keyboard, lead guitar, rhythm guitar, bass guitar, and drums, but newer songs on the album like "Red Eye", "S.I.B." and "The Day My Baby Gave Me a Surprize" were more keyboard-based. Live and promotional videos of those songs feature three sets of keyboards, an electric guitar, and a drum kit.

Composition
Both Duty Now for the Future and its predecessor, Q: Are We Not Men? A: We Are Devo!, contained material from a backlog of songs the band had written between 1974 and 1977. While the song selection for both albums was devised ahead of time, this changed when Mark Mothersbaugh brought some new compositions in for the second album's sessions and elected to abandon some of the previously chosen songs. In a 2015 interview, Casale said that, in retrospect, he felt the new material "was kind of still incubating and probably wasn't ready." 

"Devo Corporate Anthem" and its accompanying video were a nod to the 1975 film Rollerball, in which games are preceded by players and the audience standing solemnly while listening to a regional "corporate hymn". "Triumph of the Will" takes its title from the Leni Riefenstahl documentary of the same name covering the Nuremberg rallies, although its subject matter concerns desire rather than political matters. Music historian Andy Zax stated that, "On the surface, 'The Day My Baby Gave Me a Surprize' seems like one of Devo's happiest, bounciest pop confections, but a closer look reveals peculiar things lurking beneath." The band's cover of Johnny Rivers' "Secret Agent Man" features a rare lead vocal from Bob Mothersbaugh.

Production and recording
Duty Now for the Future was produced by Ken Scott. Like Brian Eno, who had produced Devo's debut album Q: Are We Not Men? A: We Are Devo!, Scott had also worked with David Bowie, most notably on the records The Rise and Fall of Ziggy Stardust and the Spiders from Mars (1972) and its follow-up, Aladdin Sane (1973). Scott heaped praise on the band, claiming they were "quite professional in the studio" and that he "loved every minute of it."

Recording for the album began in September 1978, a month after the release of their first album. Scott discussed his role in the recordings and how Devo came to choose him for the album: "I consider my job to put the act across in the best way possible, in the way THEY wish to be perceived. I hate it when I'm part of the final equation. The act was signed for their talent not mine. I just wish the modern A&R people saw things that way. I know they chose me because of the Bowie records I did, but I don't know if it was a direct recommendation from Mr. Jones. Devo always wanted to learn. That's why they worked with each producer only once. Took what they needed and then time to move on."

Duty Now for the Future found the band bringing synthesizers more into the forefront than before. Additionally, guitar sounds were often manipulated; in a 1979 interview with BAM magazine, Casale stated, "A guitar can only do what a guitar does. It's like only one tiny piece of a synthesizer. On this album, we did much more with the guitars, too. Sometimes you don't know that they're guitars." According to Scott, to record the solo for "Secret Agent Man", they "overloaded mic amps and fed the signal through headphones which were taped to the mic." 

However, in later years, band members voiced dissatisfaction with the sound of the album. In a Reddit thread on June 25, 2013, Gerald Casale commented, "I love the songs but I loathe Ken Scott's production. He 'de-balled' us." In a 2021 interview with Austin Wintory, Mark Mothersbaugh recalled that, at the time, he thought Scott had destroyed the album. Mothersbaugh stated that most of the tracks had been written to be performed live, and while the group had wanted to recreate that sound, Scott wanted to emphasize Devo's tight and robotic qualities, recording the album one instrument at a time and playing to a click track. Mothersbaugh felt that the results were not as satisfying as playing the material on the following tour.

Artwork and packaging
The album cover was designed by Janet Perr, based on a concept by Devo. Universal Product Codes (or "bar codes") were a then-new phenomenon and the band devised a satirical fake barcode for the front cover. The cover also featured a punch-out postcard, which according to Mark Mothersbaugh was "a piece of art that you could take away, a repurposed album cover." Although Warner Bros. originally rejected the idea, saying it was too cost-prohibitive, Devo instructed the label to use the band's own money to pay for it. The "Science Boy" logo originated from a science pamphlet the band had found in the late 1970s in their home town of Akron, Ohio. After first using it on a promotional item for Virgin Records, the band were contacted by the original organization that had used the image as their logo, which resulted in the band acquiring the rights to it.

The photograph of the band was taken by photographer Allan Tannenbaum for the Soho Weekly News in New York City. It was used in the album artwork by simply taking it from the front page of the newspaper in the exact same dimensions, unbeknownst to the photographer. When he discovered this, he contacted the record company and was paid for its use.

The inner sleeve included the lyrics of all the songs printed in a single block of closely printed text. The sleeve also featured a West Hollywood address from which one could request information and news about the band. In addition, an address was included to allow purchasers to order a copy of the Devo-vision videocassette from Time Life. This tape was never actually made available from Time Life and was a few years later issued under the title The Men Who Make the Music via Warner Home Video.

Promotion
Devo produced one music video for this album. "The Day My Baby Gave Me a Surprize" combined animation with blue screen effects of the band performing. In this video, Devo chiefly wore white shirts and pants and silver 3D glasses. Also of note is the appearance of Alex Mothersbaugh, the daughter of guitarist Bob Mothersbaugh. Alex would later be featured on the back cover of Devo's 1984 album, Shout.

A short clip of the band standing at attention and then saluting was filmed to accompany "Devo Corporate Anthem" and was used in concert performance.

Reception

Commercial
Duty Now for the Future was on the Billboard charts for 10 weeks, peaking at No. 73. In Canada, the album reached number 87.

Critical
Dave Marsh, writing in Rolling Stone, condemned the album, feeling that "inspired amateurism works only when the players aspire to something better." Robert Christgau of The Village Voice  panned side one as "dire" and "arena-rock", but felt "The Day My Baby Gave Me a Surprize" and "Secret Agent Man" were "as bright as anything on the debut, and the arrangements offer their share of surprizes." Red Starr of Smash Hits described it as "unimpressive", but noted that the "change of style definitely grows on you". They went on to say that, although the album was more accessible, it was "lacking the zany magic of old". Scott Isler of Trouser Press stated that the album "doesn't score as many bull's-eyes as the first but includes two anthems of malaise, 'Blockhead' and 'S.I.B. (Swelling Itching Brain)'", and noted the band's "disturbing signs of portentousness".
 
In a retrospective review for AllMusic, reviewer Mark Deming opined that the album "captures the group in the midst of a significant stylistic shift", while contending that "Triumph of the Will" "embraces fascism as a satirical target without bothering to make it sound as if they disapprove."

Track listing 

Additional tracks

Personnel
Credits adapted from Pioneers Who Got Scalped: The Anthology CD liner notes:

Devo
 Mark Mothersbaugh – vocals, keyboards, guitar
 Gerald Casale – vocals, bass guitar, keyboards
 Bob Mothersbaugh – lead guitar, vocals; lead vocals on "Secret Agent Man"
 Bob Casale – rhythm guitar, keyboards, vocals
 Alan Myers – drums

Credits adapted from the original album's liner notes:

Technical
 Ken Scott – producer, engineer
 Brian Leshon – assistant engineer
 Phil Jost – assistant engineer
 Bernie Grundman – mastering
 Janet Perr – cover art 
 Devo Inc. – graphic concept, package design
 Yale Greenfield – dust sleeve production stills

Tour
Starting only a few weeks after the conclusion of the group's previous world tour, the Duty Now Tour was significantly shorter and only covered the US and Canada.

As with all DEVO tours, the show opened with a showcase of their short film The Truth About De-Evolution, as well as the promo videos for "Satisfaction", "Come Back Jonee", and the then-newly filmed "The Day My Baby Gave Me a Surprize". The rest of the show was structured in two halves, the first half consisting entirely of material from the new album, unreleased songs (such as an early version of "Going Under"), and singles. During this half, the group were dressed in white shirts with gray pants and silver visor style glasses. Following this half, a short film would play (later appearing in The Men Who Make the Music), in which a dispute with their record label causes them to return to their yellow radiation suits.

After the short film concluded, the group returned to the stage dressed in their classic radiation suits. The second half of the show was a shortened version of their Are We Not Men? setlist, in which the yellow suits would be torn away until the performance of "Jocko Homo". As an encore, Booji Boy performed two songs: "In Heaven Everything Is Fine", from the film Eraserhead, segued into the unreleased "One That Gets Away".

Setlist 
First Leg (June–August)

 "Going Under" *
 "Timing X"
 "Soo Bawls"
 "Secret Agent Man"
 "Pink Pussycat"
 "Penetration in the Centrefold"
 "Strange Pursuit"
 "Those Darn Girls"
 "S.I.B. (Swelling Itching Brain)"
 "(I Can't Get No) Satisfaction"
 "Praying Hands"
 "Uncontrollable Urge"
 "Mongoloid"
 "Jocko Homo"
 "Smart Patrol/Mr. DNA"
 "Sloppy (I Saw My Baby Gettin')" (7/4/1979 only)
 "Come Back Jonee"
 "Gut Feeling"
 "Slap Your Mammy"
 "Devo Corporate Anthem"
 "In Heaven Everything Is Fine"
 "The One That Gets Away"

*At the time, "Going Under" was referred to as "Softcore Mutations".

Second Leg (December)

Dove:
 "It Takes a Worried Man"
 "Praying Hands"
 "Shrivel Up"
 "Gates of Steel" **
 "Jesus"
 "Gotta Serve Somebody"

Devo:
 "Freedom of Choice Theme"
 "Whip It"
 "Girl U Want"
 "Penetration in the Centrefold"
 "Timing X"
 "Wiggly World"
 "Secret Agent Man"
 "Pink Pussycat"
 "Blockhead"
 "Be Stiff"
 "Uncontrollable Urge"
 "Mongoloid"
 "Come Back Jonee"
 "(I Can't Get No) Satisfaction"
 "Jocko Homo"
 "Smart Patrol/Mr. DNA"
 "Gut Feeling"
 "Slap Your Mammy"
 "U Got Me Bugged"
 "Fountain of Filth"
 "Devo Corporate Anthem"
 "Gates of Steel" **
*At the time, "Going Under" was referred to as "Softcore Mutations".
**Gates of Steel" was only performed on December 31st.

References

Bibliography

External links

Albums produced by Ken Scott
Devo albums
1979 albums
Warner Records albums
Punk rock albums by American artists